Josh Glenn (born 10 March 1994) is a former professional Australian rules footballer who played for the Gold Coast Football Club in the Australian Football League (AFL).

Josh Glenn was drafted with pick 7 in the 2015 rookie draft. He was elevated to the main list and made his debut against  in round 5, 2015. He was delisted in October 2015, after informing the Gold Coast Football Club that he no longer wished to play on in 2016.

In 2017 he returned to Central District to play football in the South Australian National Football League (SANFL). He later switched teams to play for Norwood. 

In 2019 Glenn was banned for four years after the presence of two anabolic steroids were found in a sample taken after a SANFL game in 2018.

He returned to play the final game of the regular season for Golden Grove in the Adelaide Footy League, after serving his 4 year ban in 2022.

References

External links

1994 births
Living people
Gold Coast Football Club players
Central District Football Club players
Australian rules footballers from South Australia
Doping cases in Australian rules football
Australian sportspeople in doping cases